Heinz Verbnjak (born 2 September 1973) from Klagenfurt is an Austrian ski mountaineer.

Verbnjak won several national races and was member of the national team.

Selected results 
 2007:
 1st, Hochwurzen-Berglauf
 4th, Sellaronda Skimarathon (together with Martin Echtler)
 6th, Mountain Attack marathon
 2008:
 1st, Knappen-Königs-Trophy, Bischofshofen
 1st, Champ Or Cramp
 2nd, Preberlauf
 3rd, Sellaronda Skimarathon (together with Andreas Ringhofer)
 4th, Mountain Attack marathon
 2009:
 8th, Mountain Attack marathon

External links 
 Heinz Verbnjak at skimountaineering.org

References 

1973 births
Living people
Austrian male ski mountaineers